Alcaligenes denitrificans is a Gram-negative, oxidase- and catalase-positive, strictly aerobic, motile bacterium with peritrichous flagella, from the genus  Alcaligenes. Based on 16S rDNA sequence analysis and the low degree of DNA relatedness between other members of Achromobacter species, Yabuuchi et al propose that Alcaligenes denitrificans should be classified as a subspecies of Achromobacter xylosoxidans (A. x. subsp. denitrificans).

References

Burkholderiales
Bacteria described in 1983